Haleh Siah (also Romanized as Hāleh Sīāh; also known as Nīs Kajreh, and Nīskeh Jāreh) is a village in Dasht-e Hor Rural District, in the Central District of Salas-e Babajani County, Kermanshah Province, Iran. At the 2006 census, its population was 33, in 7 families.

References 

Populated places in Salas-e Babajani County